Černý Důl ( or Schwarzental) is a market town in Trutnov District in the Hradec Králové Region of the Czech Republic. It has about 700 inhabitants. It lies in the Giant Mountains.

Administrative parts
Villages of Čistá v Krkonoších and Fořt are administrative parts of Černý Důl.

Etymology
The name literally means "Black Mine". It probably refers to the location in deep (black) forests when it was founded, and to its mining history.

Geography
Černý Důl lies in the Giant Mountains. The northern half of the municipal territory lies in the Krkonoše National Park.

History

The first written mention about iron ore mining in the area of today's Černý Důl is from 1383. The manor was purchased by Kryštof Gendorf in 1533. In that time, the area was formed by three parts: Nová Ves village, settlement of Gottes Hilf, and grouping of huts called III. horský díl. The oldest was Nová Ves, which was first mentioned in 1498. Gottes Hilf established near Nová Ves nad named after one of mines. It was first mentioned in 1556, when a chapel was built here.

In 1564, Gottes Hilf was promoted to a market town with right of a free mining town and renamed Černý Důl. In 1607, the chapel was rebuilt and extended to the Church of Saint Michael the Archangel. After the mining ended, the population had to reorientate to linen making, spinning, agriculture and livestock, as the land consisted mostly of mountain pastures. In the 18th century, limestone began to be mined here.

Sport

Černý Důl is known as a ski resort with several slopes with lifts.

In popular culture
On 17 June 2007, a Czech program known as "Panorama" (which shows images of the entire country each morning) was hijacked and a fake nuclear bomb (done with CGI) appeared in the town. This was later confirmed as a hoax.

Twin towns – sister cities

Černý Důl is twinned with:
 Kowary, Poland

References

External links

Market towns in the Czech Republic